The effects of Hurricane Isabel in Delaware resulted in one of only thirteen presidential disaster declarations for the state of Delaware. Hurricane Isabel formed from a tropical wave on September 6, 2003, in the tropical Atlantic Ocean. It quickly weakened over land and became extratropical over Pennsylvania the next day. At that time, Isabel was a strong tropical storm located in central Virginia.

The effects of the hurricane were compounded by flooding caused by the remnants of Tropical Storm Henri days before. Moderate winds of up to  downed numerous trees, tree limbs, and power lines across the state, leaving at least 15,300 without power. Numerous low-lying areas were flooded due to high surf, strong storm surge, or run-off from flooding further inland. The passage of Hurricane Isabel resulted in $40 million in damage (2003 USD, ($  USD)) and no casualties in the state. Hurricane Isabel was the ninth named storm of the 2003 Atlantic hurricane season on September 6, 2003.

Preparations

On September 16, 44 hours before Hurricane Isabel made landfall on the Outer Banks of North Carolina, the National Hurricane Center issued a tropical storm watch for the entire coastline of Delaware. The National Hurricane Center also briefly issued a hurricane watch for the coastline. On September 17, 26 hours before Isabel made landfall, the watches were changed to tropical storm warnings. Though located within the cone of uncertainty, all subsequent forecasts predicted a landfall on North Carolina with the hurricane passing to the west of the state.

Governor Ruth Ann Minner declared a state of emergency prior to the arrival of the hurricane. The declaration also included for the activation of the Delaware National Guard to assist in hurricane related duties. Minner mandated residents in 13 low-lying areas of Sussex County to evacuate. In all, 787 people evacuated across the state to seven emergency shelters set up by the American Red Cross. Officials began recommending visitors to leave potentially affected areas by three days before Isabel made landfall. Governor Minner mandated all schools to be closed on the day of the hurricane's landfall, and recommended all residents in mobile homes to evacuate and for businesses to close. The University of Delaware preemptively canceled classes. The Cape May-Lewes Ferry closed for several days in anticipation of the storm. The Delaware Department of Transportation planned to place restrictions on state roads in the event strong wind gusts were recorded.

Impact

Tides were only slightly above normal, though high surf on top of the storm surge resulted in beach erosion, particularly in Sussex County. The high waters breached dunes south of Bethany Beach, and several locations along Delaware Route 1 were flooded. Heavy rainfall further inland resulted in moderate to severe river flooding. Runoff from streams were slowed due to the approaching storm surge from the hurricane.

At the Delaware Breakwater East End Lighthouse in Lewes, strong waves destroyed the lower deck of the lighthouse, while powerful winds blew out the watchroom window. A group of eight volunteers quickly repaired the damage. Moderate wind gusts knocked down numerous trees, tree limbs, and power lines, causing widespread power outages in the state. Conectiv Energy reported the power outage associated with the hurricane as one of the worst in its history. At least 15,300 were left without power during the worst of the hurricane, including 2,500 in the capital city of Dover. Due to the power outages, only one traffic light north of the city of Wilmington was operational. Eight roads remained closed for several days, primarily due to flooding. Flooding affected the cities of Seaford, Blades, Bayview, and Augustine Beach, with residents in the latter two being forced to evacuate due to severe flooding conditions. Several state parks reported downed trees and damage. Damage in the state totaled $40 million (2003 USD, $44 million 2006 USD), and there were no deaths in the state as a result of the storm.

Aftermath
On September 20, two days after Hurricane Isabel passed the state, Governor Ruth Ann Minner made a formal request for a federal disaster declaration for the state. Later that day, President George W. Bush issued a federal disaster declaration for Delaware, one of twelve disaster declarations for the state. The declaration allowed for the use of federal disaster funds and emergency resources to help families and businesses recover from the effects of Hurricane Isabel. State and federal officials opened a disaster recovery center in Georgetown and Wilmington to assist individuals who suffered losses from Isabel and the remnants of Tropical Storm Henri just days before. 761 people visited the recovery centers before they closed. One week after the disaster declaration, residents began receiving checks for those who applied for aid. By about two months after the passage of Hurricane Isabel, 659 residents applied for assistance, with slightly over $1 million (2003 USD, $1.1 million 2006 USD) being distributed to the victims. 141 loan applications were received, as well. FEMA distributed about $2.5 million ($  USD) in Small Business Administration loans, and also received 183 public assistance loans for repair or replacement of public facilities.

A total of 35 power crews, along with outside contractors, worked to restore power. By two days after the storm, 2,000 remained without power in scattered areas. Various locations in the city of Dover were without power for about 30 hours. There, the removal of debris exceeded the capacity of the local landfall, resulting in officials temporarily storing it elsewhere. Over 200 volunteers donated time, food and money to provide hot meals for individuals and families affected by the storm. Support teams provided by county officials transported over 300 tons of ruined accessories from the storm, such as appliances, carpets, and drywall, to local landfills. Qualifying for two NASCAR races at Dover International Speedway were cancelled due to the hurricane, although the races went on as scheduled.

See also

 List of Atlantic hurricanes
 List of retired Atlantic hurricane names
 List of Delaware hurricanes

References

External links
 NHC's Tropical Cyclone Report for Hurricane Isabel

Delaware
Isabel (2003)
2003 in Delaware
Isabel